Roaring Spring is a borough in Blair County, Pennsylvania, United States. The population was 2,392 at the 2020 census. It is part of the Altoona, PA Metropolitan Statistical Area

History
Roaring Spring was established around the Big Spring in Morrison's Cove, a clean and dependable water source vital to the operation of a paper mill. Prior to 1866, when the first paper mill was built, Roaring Spring had been a grist mill hamlet with a country store at the intersection of two rural roads that lead to the mill near the spring. A grist mill, powered by the spring water, had operated at that location since at least the 1760s. After 1867, as the paper mill expanded, surrounding tracts of land were acquired to accommodate housing development for new workers. The formalization of a town plan, however, never occurred. As a result, the seemingly random street pattern of the historic district is the product of hilly topography, a small network of pre-existing country roads that converged near the Big Spring, and the property lines of adjacent tracts that were acquired through the years for community expansion. The arterial streets of the district are now East Main, West Main, Spang and Bloomfield, each of which leads out of the borough to surrounding townships. Two of these streets — Spang and East Main — meet with Church Street at the district's main intersection called "Five Points." The boundaries of the district essentially include those portions of Roaring Spring Borough which had been laid out for development by the early 1920s. Since the district's period of significance extends to 1944, most of those buildings erected after the 1920s were built as infill within the areas already subdivided by the 1920s. In the early 1960s, the Borough began to annex sections of adjacent Taylor Township, especially to the east around the then new Rt. 36 Bypass.

Daniel Mathias (D. M.) Bare laid out Roaring Spring's first 50 building lots in 1865 after he and two partners decided to locate the region's first paper mill near the spring.[3] These lots were located within and around the so-called village "triangle" defined by West Main, Spang, and East Main Streets. By 1873, the borough contained about 170 lots and 50 buildings, which included the paper and grist mills, three churches, a company store, a schoolhouse, and one hotel. The population stood at about 100. The triangle remained the industrial, commercial and retailing core of the town until 1957 when the bypass of Main Street, PA Rt. 36, was built to the east of town through Taylor Township. As is true of many American small towns, many village merchants along with new businesses have since relocated to the new highway. The village core retains only a few shops and professional offices, but still holds the Roaring Spring Blank Book Company and Roaring Spring Water Bottling Company, all of the historic church buildings, the public library(formerly the Eldon Inn), the borough building, the post office(earlier moved from farther up East Main St.).  The elementary school (former junior-senior high school)was demolished in 2010.

Historic District

The Roaring Spring Historic District was listed on the National Register of Historic Places in 1995. Portions of the text below were adapted from a copy of the original nomination document.

Description 

The Roaring Spring Historic District is located within the Borough of Roaring Spring, a paper-mill town of about 2,600 established in the late 1860s in southern Blair County, south-central Pennsylvania.[1] Roaring Spring is situated within the northwest quadrant of a long bowl-like valley known as Morrisons Cove, one of dozens of long but broad valleys in Pennsylvania's Ridge and Valley region. The town developed just southeast of a natural pass into the valley called McKee's Gap where an important iron smelting business (Martha Furnace) operated through the mid 19th century. The site of Roaring Spring is moderately hilly, drained by Cabbage and Halter Creeks. The most prominent natural feature is the Big Spring, or Roaring Spring, a large natural limestone spring so-called because of the great noise its eight-million-gallon-a-day stream once made rushing out of the hillside near the village center.[2] Roaring Spring is overwhelmingly residential (91 percent) in scale, but also includes churches, stops, professional offices, a municipal building, parks, a cemetery, a book factory complex, and a former railroad station. The largest segment of the building stock between 1865 and 1944 was constructed between the 1890s and 1930s. Architecturally, the district contains a variety of late 19th to early 20th century styles and vernacular building types, including Gothic Revival, Queen Anne, Colonial Revival, Bungalow, Foursquare, Gable Fronts, Gable Fronts & Wings, I Houses, and double-pile Georgian types. Ninety (90) percent of the district's 643 properties is rated as contributing. The remaining 10 percent consists of buildings less than 50 years old (constructed after 1944) or older buildings whose architectural integrity has been lost through inappropriate alterations. Overall, most alterations, such as inappropriate replacement of windows, doors and porch posts, are reversible if desired.

Roaring Spring was established around the Big Spring, a clean and dependable water source vital to the operation of a paper mill. Prior to 1866, when the first paper mill was built, Roaring Spring had been a grist-mill hamlet with a country store at the intersection of two rural roads that lead to the mill near the spring. A grist mill, which was powered by the spring water, had operated at that location since at least the 1760s. After 1867, as the paper mill expanded, surrounding tracts of land were acquired to accommodate housing development for new workers. The formalization of a town plan, however, never occurred. As a result, the seemingly random street pattern of the historic district is the product of hilly topography, a small network of pre-existing country roads that converged near the Big Spring, and the property lines of adjacent tracts that were acquired through the years for community expansion. The arterial streets of the district are now East Main, West Main, Spang and Bloomfield, each of which leads out of the borough to surrounding townships. Two of these streets — Spang and East Main — meet with Church Street at the district's main intersection called "The Five Points." The boundaries of the district essentially include those portions of Roaring Spring Borough which had been laid out for development by the early 1920s. Since the district's period of significance extends to 1944, most of those buildings erected after the 1920s were built as infill within the areas already subdivided by the 1920s. In the early 1960s, the Borough began to annex sections of adjacent Taylor Township, especially to the east around the then new Rt. 36 Bypass.

Daniel Mathias (D. M.) Bare laid out Roaring Spring's first 50 building lots in 1865 after he and two partners decided to locate the region's first paper mill near the spring.[3] These lots were located within and around the so-called village "triangle" defined by West Main, Spang, and East Main Streets. By 1873, the borough contained about 170 lots and 50 buildings, which included the paper and grist mills, three churches, a company store, a schoolhouse, and one hotel. The population stood at about 100. The triangle remained the industrial, commercial and retailing core of the town until 1957 when the bypass of East Main Street, PA Rt. 36, was built to the east of town through Taylor Township. As is true of many American small towns, many village merchants along with new businesses have since relocated to the new highway. The village core retains only a few shops and professional offices, but still holds the Roaring Spring Blank Book Company and Roaring Spring Water Bottling Company, all of the historic church buildings, the public library (the former Eldon Inn), the borough building, and the post office.

Most of the historic commercial or mixed-use buildings are concentrated in the village triangle. These include an assortment of strictly commercial properties, such as the brick, three-story Odd Fellows Hall (1882) with its storefront and meeting hall above at 269 N. Main Street, the three-story, wood-frame Hite's Furniture Store (ca. 1888) next door, and the stone, three-story, semi-Romanesque Roaring Spring Bank (1902) next to the store at 257 N. Main Street. All three stand directly across the street from the former location of the Roaring Spring Department Store (ca. 1874), otherwise known as "the company store," and across from the old Borough Building and Fire Station (1906).  The grist mill, demolished in the 1980s, which also housed the town jail and street department, was between the borough building and the department store. This immediate area served as the commercial, governmental and industrial center of the town. Directly behind the company store to the west is the paper mill, while next door to the former Borough Building once stood the Bare flour mill (demolished 1960s), the early industrial forerunner to the paper mill. Mixed-use examples within this village area include the three-story brick Zook Building (ca. 1885) at East Main and Cemetery Streets, which formerly housed the post office, and two wood-frame store fronts with second-floor apartments on East Main. Another well-preserved example of this traditional mixed-use type is the former Stump's Grocery Store at Spang and Poplar Streets. While located outside of the village triangle, the general store was built by John F. Himes to serve one of the first new residential areas developed after the paper mill's plant expansion of 1878.  The store was originally started at the five points where the borough building now stands and was moved to poplar street across from his home.  Himes also operated a vineyard bordered by today's Spang, Girard, Poplar, and Cherry Streets of which one vine remains (as of 2011).  He arrived as a German immigrant and worked as a stable boy at his uncle's hotel, which held the dry town's last (and maybe only) liquor license at the corner of Spang and West Main Street across from the railroad station.  He also was instrumental in building St. Luke's Lutheran Church at the corner of Girard and East Main Street.

In the decades following the Civil War, single-family residential development gradually spread over the low hills surrounding the village center. Roaring Spring's patterns of growth were largely determined by the periods of expansion for the paper mill and the Roaring Spring Blank Book Company, an affiliated business. The opening of the Pennsylvania Railroad branch line from Altoona in 1871 also stimulated a great deal of growth. During these periods, parcels of adjacent land or woodland were purchased and subdivided for new house construction. Through the 19th century, one of the larger private developers was D. M. Bare. One example of his work is the lots along Park Avenue, a site which he subdivided and sold off in 1885 after acquiring the George Spang Farm.

The lots are relatively narrow (50–60 ft.) but deep (120–150 ft.) with ample backyards that often hold one-story frame or brick garages on an alley serving an entire block. Average density is five to seven houses per acre. This configuration — a single-family house sited close to the front lot line with a detached service building at the rear of a long backyard — is the basic lot layout of towns in central Pennsylvania. Most of the rear-lot service buildings are either small 19th century carriage barns converted to garages or 20th century auto garages, depending upon the age of the house. The carriage barns are generally wood frame while the garages tend to be brick, depending upon the building material of the house. The moderately sloping topography did little to impede local builders, who merely terraced the sites and erected stone retaining walls to hold the yards.

Because of the town's relatively stable employment patterns since the 1860s, Roaring Spring has enjoyed a high degree of home ownership. Of the 643 buildings in the district, over 92 percent were originally built as homes, most of which are single-family dwellings. Besides single-family houses, the district contains 21 apartments (mostly converted single-family residences); 14 mixed-use buildings (commercial/residential); 11 professional/commercial buildings (mostly converted houses); seven municipal properties; six industrial buildings (mostly the Blank Book complex); eight churches; and one cemetery. Sixty-three (63) percent of the district's building stock (contributing and noncontributing) is wood-frame; 33 percent is brick; the remaining 4 percent is stone or concrete block. With the exception of a few industrial or commercial buildings like the Blank Book Co. and the Planing Mill, nearly all of the district's brick buildings (mostly houses) are actually brick veneer over wood framing. The use of brick as a construction material peaked in the 1920s.

Sixty-Nine (69) Percent  of the foundations are stone, which supports almost all buildings erected before ca. 1920. While stone as a foundation material is common in pre-1920s buildings, its use as a structural material is very rare due in large measure to the common availability and economy of sawn lumber, and the age of the community which postdated the vernacular use of stone as a regional building material. As a foundation material, stone was generally replaced in the 1920s by cast concrete block (generally molded as a rock-face ashlar), which in turn was succeeded by cinderblock and poured concrete after the 1940s. After concrete and cinderblock, concrete block is the third most common foundation material (almost 3 percent); it was also employed for garages, outbuildings and additions in the 1920s and 1930s. Most contributing houses bear full front porches, the vast majority of which are intact. Original roof materials were generally slate or tin (raised seam, corrugated, or pressed pattern). While a fair number survive, many others have been replaced for economy with modern asphalt shingle. Even where original slate roofs have been replaced, many decorative slate shingles covering the fascia boards of large window gables survive, especially on turn-of-the-century Gothic Revival types. This decorative practice, fairly common on houses built from 1900 to 1920 by the Roaring Spring Planing Mill Co., can be seen in other period buildings around the Morrisons Cove area where the Planing Mill's contractors are known to have worked.

Stylistically, the historic house types of Roaring Spring are largely vernacular adaptations of nationally common styles between the 1870s and early 20th century. From the 1870s to 1900s, these included Gothic Revivals, Queen Annes, Gable Fronts, Gable Front & Wings, I-Houses and double-pile Georgian types. From the 1900s to 1930s, a period which accounts for 54 percent of the historic housing stock, these included Bungalows, Four Squares, Colonial Revivals, and Cape Cod types, sometimes modestly detailed with Craftsman or Colonial Revival trim. The various styles and types generally reflect the national trends in builders' homes during those periods. Those houses built after the period of significance (post 1944) tend to be later Cape Cod types, ranches, bi-levels and a variety of other suburban builders' homes.

The greatest number of extant Gable-Fronts (or Temple-Fronts) in the district were built between the 1890s and 1910s, although a few older examples date to the 1880s. A number of variations exist, such as the Gable Front & Wing and the Gable-Front & T Wing, the latter a local variant that builders from the Roaring Spring Planing Mill seemed to have favored in the 1900s. Most houses are balloon-frame construction, however, the Four-Square, built here in the greatest numbers between the 1900s and 1930s, is equally divided between wood and brick. Queen Annes range from the 1880s to 1910s, and are often really Four-Squares in form beneath a slightly more complicated roofline and decorated wall surface (ornamental slate or wood shingles) usually concentrated in the gables. The I- House, which ranges primarily between the 1850s and 1900s, is also equally divided between wood and brick. The center-door "Georgian" type (double-pile, side-gable roof, symmetrical massing) was built here between the 1850s and 1940s, with most examples ranging from four to five bays in width. After the Civil War, local builders often gave this type a large centered front gable, creating a Gothic Revival look, especially since most of these examples held full front porches with Gothic Revival trim. The Bungalow type, while not as common as the preceding four, was prevalent between the 1920s and 1930s.

Many of the vernacular Gothic Revival and I-House dwellings, which line Locust Street in the Hogback neighborhood south of the mill, date from the late 1860s to 1870s. Farther away from the mill, on a hillside at the east end of the district, stand dozens of Four-Squares, Gable Fronts, and late Gothic Revival types built after the mill expansions of 1898 and 1912. These examples are found along New, Poplar, Walnut and Cherry Streets. Bungalow types from the 1920 to 1930s are scattered throughout the district in wood or brick.

The triangular area of the old commercial village contains a mixture of residential, mixed-use, and commercial buildings dating from the 1870s to the early 1900s. Of the commercial types, perhaps the most impressive is the Eldon Inn (1907), a three-story, brick Colonial Revival at Main and Girard Streets built close to the passenger station for the convenience of railroad travelers. The inn, which never served liquor, was built by Bare and his three sons-in-law, in large measure to keep the town dry as it had been since the 1890s. The oldest known residence in this area is the Wilderson House (ca. 1872), a typical wood-frame I-House fronting on West Main Street just south of Girard Street.

The district's eight churches, constructed of either brick, stone, or wood, were built between 1867 and 1934. The oldest is the wood-frame Mennonite meeting house on Poplar Street overlooking North Main, originally built for the Methodist congregation in 1867. The builder was the Rev. John A. J. Williams, a carpenter by trade, who also served briefly as Methodist minister. The two most prominently sited churches stand at the Five Points intersection: the Bare Memorial Church of God (1889–1930), a large brick building supported by the Bare family at East Main and Church Streets, and the Trinity United Methodist Church (1898), a stone building at East Main and Spang Streets. The district's only fully extant school building was the old Junior-Senior High School at the corner of Cemetery and Poplar Streets. Partially funded by the Works Progress Administration in 1936, this three-story brick and concrete building was designed in the Art Moderne mode by the architect Joseph Hoover, a native of the town.  It was demolished in 2010.

The civic center of the borough, counted as one of three contributing sites, is the borough park with its duck pond and fountain designed around the Big Spring. The present park, which Bare set aside for public use, is the result of successive improvement projects started in the 1870s and continuing through the early 20th century. A stone arch, counted as a contributing structure, was built in 1874 to channel the spring, and a breast dam was added in 1876 to impound the spring water into a pond; the first dam was replaced by the present steel and cement dam, a noncontributing structure, in 1958. Sometime in the 1920s to 1930s, the pond was further contained by a concrete basin. In 1937, the Bare Memorial Fountain, counted as a second contributing structure, with its oscillating streams and colored lights was added.

The two other contributing sites are Greenlawn Cemetery and Memorial Park. Greenlawn, which is located between Cemetery and Girard Streets, contains many of the town's founding families and figures including D. M. Bare. Established high on one of the town's many hillsides, the cemetery is distinguished by its scenic vistas. Memorial Park, located at Grove and Locust Streets, was set aside by Bare, who gave the land to the school district in 1918. The site was originally called Sugar Grove, a smaller part of the Spang Farm which Bare purchased in 1885.

Adjoining the Borough Park along Spang Street stands a row of large Victorian-era homes built in 1889 for D. M. Bare and members of his family. These are substantial yet loosely eclectic variations on the Queen Anne and Gothic Revival styles as rendered by builders from the Roaring Spring Planing Mill. Perhaps the most impressive is the Edwin G. Bobb House built closest to the park by a son-in-law of D. M. Bare. The rear yard of the house is the approximate former site of the George B. Spang House (ca. 1821), the home of the miller from whom D. M. Bare purchased the  Mill Seat Tract in 1863. Spang had operated the gristmill in the settlement, which was known as Spang's Mill, since 1821. His homestead now stands at 724 Church Street, about one block away, where it was moved in 1889 by Bare prior to construction of the Bobb House. The Spang House is a typical five-bay, double-pile Georgian type dwelling, the core of which is log.

Besides the Spang Street manager's row, the district contains two other large landmark houses built for local leaders: The Dr. W. A. Nason House built ca. 1900 at the south end of town between Locust and Oakmont Place, and the Dr. William M. Eldon House (ca. 1895 – 1900) at East Main and Cemetery Streets. Nason established a large private hospital that stood on the site of the YMCA between 1896 and 1961. His house is a boxy three-story Colonial Revival design made of the same local "blue" limestone as the Blank Book Company office (see below). Eldon was a son-in-law of D. M. Bare, a member of Dr. Nason's hospital staff, and the town druggist, whose former store at E. Main Street stands next door to the Eldon House. The house, which was constructed by the Roaring Spring Planing Mill in the old village triangle area, now contains apartments and an attorney's office.

Across Spang Street overlooking the duck pond stands the Blank Book Company, an ancillary business founded by Bare in 1887 to produce ledgers, tablets and composition books from the mill's paper stock. Practically all of the book factory complex survives, including the impressive three-story Office and Warehouse Building (1900) constructed in a castellated fashion with quarry-faced ashlar cut from local "blue" limestone. The oldest building in the five-building complex is the two-story brick Binding Building (1888). The others include the Printing House (1895), a three-story brick building; the brick Shipping and Stock Room Building (1905) at three-stories; and the five-story brick Warehouse built in 1914.[4]  An original fire station is located in the yard in front of the stone Blank Book building.

Also adjoining the park at the west side is the surviving building (1904) from the Roaring Spring Planing Mill Company. The mill supplied finished lumber and pre-fabricated building components to area builders, and is credited with constructing most of the housing and other buildings in Roaring Spring. The company also supplied heating coal for home furnaces. Co-founded in 1887 by D. M. Bare, the planing mill was initially owned in fourths by Bare and other partners. Although the company erected dozens of houses, its early years were not profitable and the partnership sold out to D. M. Bare & Co. in 1897. A devastating fire in 1903 destroyed the original 1887 wood-frame complex. The present building, a one-story brick structure with gable roof, dates from ca. 1904 and replaced one of the originals destroyed by fire. Three or four other mill buildings, also constructed after the fire, have since been demolished and an open lawn planted in their place. Between 1910 and 1920, the Planing Mill Co. erected 97 buildings (14 frame and 83 brick), principally houses. Extant examples of its work include many of the borough's buildings erected between 1887 and the early 1950s. As several examples, the earliest homes on New Street, between Church and Lower Streets, were built in 1909 by the Planing Mill.  The remaining building now houses The Roaring Spring Bottled Water company store.

Along Main Street, to the west of the book factory and park, stands the Roaring Spring Passenger Station (ca. 1905). This one-story brick building with hipped roof was built by the Pennsylvania Railroad for its Morrisons Cove Branch to serve the paper mill. Remarkably, it is the only historic passenger station surviving in Blair County.[5] It now housed the historical society. The branch line remains intact and is used weekly for freight service to the paper mill and points south in Morrisons Cove. A PRR caboose is displayed here.  Architecturally, the district is quite intact overall. Eight-seven (87) percent of the district's 617 properties are rated as contributing. The remaining 13 percent consist of buildings less than 50 years old or those few older buildings whose alterations or additions have destroyed their architectural integrity. Approximately 65 percent of the noncontributing stock consists of buildings less than 50 years old. The four principal noncontributing buildings in the district are the Roaring Spring Bottling Company (ca. 1980) located on West Main Street behind the Blank Book Company, the YMCA building (1986) at Grove and Main Streets, the Borough Building (ca. 1948) at Spang, Church and East Main Streets, and the former Roaring Spring Department Store building (the Company Store). Although the core of the store dates to ca. 1874, successive alterations, especially in 1961, destroyed the integrity of the building. The paper mill complex contains just two small historic buildings: a one-story frame maintenance building (1900) and a two-story brick-and-frame clay house (c. 1900). A major explosion and fire in 1951 destroyed many of the older buildings. The mill owners have since demolished many others over the years to upgrade the plant.[6] Because so little historic fabric survives, and the two historic buildings are not visible from the public road, the mill complex has been drawn out of the district. Only one important contributing resource has experienced significant contextual change: the area around the planing mill building, which was surrounded originally by other mill buildings on three sides, has been cleared for a lawn and parking lot as part of the borough park area.

While some individual buildings have undergone contemporary remodeling, the district retains its fundamental architectural integrity. As is common to this region, many wood-frame buildings have been sided with either vinyl or aluminum. Some houses have also had windows replaced with modern sash, resulting in some loss of architectural detail. A much smaller number have had their original sliding sash replaced with large "picture" windows or bay windows. In other cases, Victorian-era porch posts and ornamental details like brackets have been replaced with simple square posts or iron rod supports. Some roofs, which originally were metal (either raised seam, corrugated or a stamped pattern), have been replaced with modern composite shingle. A modest number of these early 20th century metal surfaces, which were corrugated or stamped pattern, survive. Original slate roofs exist in more significant numbers. Perhaps half of these examples have been covered with a silver paint applied as a sealant and heat reflectant. Despite the results of contemporary maintenance, a large majority of buildings retain many other significant features, such as original windows, doors, porches, chimneys and rooflines. Other underlying characteristics, such as building scale, massing, setbacks and site location, remain intact as well. Overall, most of the common renovations, such as modern siding and inappropriate porch posts, are relatively superficial and reversible if desired.

Significance

The Roaring Spring Historic District is locally significant in the areas of architecture, industry and social history as an excellent example of a paternally founded and managed paper-mill town in central Pennsylvania, one whose architecture reflects how the growth of a hometown, family-owned industry stimulated and, in many cases, directed the development patterns and architectural character of the community. As the first paper-mill town in Blair County, Roaring Spring played an important role in establishing a small regional paper industry.[7] Only two other paper mills have operated in the immediate region: one in Tyrone, co-founded by D. M. Bare in 1878, and the other in Williamsburg started in 1905 by steel magnate Charles Schwab.[8] The Borough of Roaring Spring and its paper mill were essentially the creation of one person, Daniel Mathias Bare (1834–1925). As the town's 50th year history noted: "To write a detailed account of the life and activities of Daniel Mathias Bare is practically equivalent to writing the industrial, and, to a very great extent, the institutional history of Roaring Spring. From the time he located here in 1864 until the time of his death he was pre-eminently the town's greatest leader, occupying the foremost ranks of those who promoted its industrial, commercial and religious enterprises."[9] Based on Bare's leadership, a good geographical location and a plentiful supply of clean water, the town became a successful regional producer of paper and related products from 1867 onward. Architecturally, the commercial, industrial, institutional, and residential character of the town retains an integrity that accurately conveys the developmental evolution of the community between 1821 and 1944.

Before 1868, Roaring Spring was called Spang's Mill, a hamlet in Taylor Township situated around a gristmill operated by George B. Spang.[10] The area was patented in the 1760s by white settlers attracted to the Big Spring, an eight-million-gallon-a-day limestone spring that emerges from a hillside in the center of town. At least as early as the 1760s, a gristmill was operated here by a German Dunkard named Jacob Neff and it was called Neff's Mill. German Dunkards and Scots-Irish Presbyterians were the predominant pioneer groups in Morrisons Cove during the late 18th century. As late as the 1750s, the land around the spring had probably contained a village of Lenni Lenape Indians.[11]

Ironmaking played a contributing role in Spang Mill's early growth, especially through the Civil War before the paper mill was founded. The village stood about mid course between a large iron furnace (Martha Furnace) at McKee's Gap to the north and an iron-ore quarry to the south at Bloomfield. Teamsters driving the ore wagons often traded at the gristmill and a general store. The district's oldest known building from this pre-paper mill era is the Johannes Lower House, a log farmhouse at 912 Bloomfield St., built ca. 1808–10. Although substantially enlarged and covered with siding, the south half of the structure still contains the original house. At the time, Bloomfield Street was a country road leading through Morrisons Cove toward McKee's Gap.

D. M. Bare moved with his wife to Spang's Mill in 1864 after having purchased the  "Mill Seat Tract" with his father, a farmer from Sinking Valley in Blair County, north of Altoona. Attracted to the location because of the spring's dependable flow and superior water quality, Bare initially operated the gristmill and general store. He built the first paper mill in 1866 with two partners, John Eby and John Morrison, but a disastrous fire destroyed the wood-frame building just after its completion. The three men rebuilt on the site almost immediately, and by 1867 were in business again, establishing a trade in low-grade paper made from rag, gunny sacking and straw. Through the rest of the 19th century, the mill evolved from a maker of manila wrapping paper and newspaper to a manufacturer of fine bond by the late 1930s.

The Bares had three daughters, all of whom married men that Bare groomed to manage various aspects of the family business. In time, all three — Dr. Abraham L. Garver, Edwin G. Bobb and Dr. William M. Eldon — became partners and/or managers in one of Bare's largely family-controlled companies. Throughout his working life, Bare retained partners in most of his business ventures, although he appears to have maintained control over these operations either through intermediaries or family members. The paper mill was incorporated in 1907 and the Bare family retained ownership until 1946 when the business was sold to a paper company from Wisconsin.[12]

Since 1867, when the mill began operation, the plant has been expanded or substantially retooled at least nine times: 1875, 1878, 1892, 1898, 1912, 1924, ca. 1946, 1951 and 1972, according to the town's centennial history. In 1873, Bare's single wood-frame building produced . of paper a day, not quite one ton. Two years later, a boiler explosion forced Bare & Co. to rebuild, converting the cotton rag mill to wood pulp production. A second paper machine was added in 1878, and by 1881 production had increased to 3 tons a day. A third machine was added in 1892, and in 1898 the plant was completely retooled. By 1905, following the installation of a bleach-making plant and the reconstruction of the steam-power plant, output averaged nearly 26 tons a day. By 1937, production had increased to 40 tons a day and the mill employed 250 people.[13] Each time the mill expanded or retooled, older outmoded structures were demolished and new ones added, until 1951 when a major explosion destroyed many of the remaining historic buildings.

D. M. Bare's influence can be found in practically every aspect of town life: out of his general store in 1864, he developed a department store which became known as "the company store;", now Roaring Spring Department Store, in 1867, he co-sponsored the construction of the first Methodist Church; from 1868 to 1883, he served as one of the first postmasters, nominating the village's name change to Roaring Spring in 1868; he oversaw the creation of the town's first modern utilities, including the telephone system (1880), the water supply (1892), and electrical service (1892). The paper company underwrote the cost of extending a line from Altoona to Roaring Spring where the first telephone was installed in the head office of the mill. In a desire to create more jobs in 1887, Bare co-founded the Roaring Spring Blank Book Company, which became a primary customer for his paper, and later generated electric current for residential service until the 1920s. Bare eventually entrusted the operation of Blank Book to his son-in-law, Dr. A. L. Garver, who joined the company at its founding and became general manager by 1891. Garver is credited with building Blank Book into the world's third leading maker of accounting book and school stationery by the 1920s.[14] In the 1880s, Bare set aside land for the town's first public parks: Memorial Park at Grove Street and the Borough Park at Spang and Spring Streets. In 1902, he founded the town's first bank, and through the 1900-1910s oversaw the brick paving of many public streets. In 1907, he co-founded the Eldon Inn with his three sons-in-law as the town's leading hotel for business travelers. Throughout his lifetime here (1863–1925), Bare is credited with playing many other informal roles to help organize and improve the community life of the town.

Bare played his most substantial role in shaping the architectural character of the town through co-founding the Roaring Spring Planing Mill in 1887. Operated as a heating coal and building supply business with a contracting service on the side, the mill is credited with constructing most of the houses and other buildings of note in Roaring Spring between 1887 and the early 1950s. While the company records have been lost, the personal records of David S. Smaltz (1861–1935), a carpenter who worked for the contracting business are impressive. Smaltz's own accounts kept by the family in the 1960s recorded that between 1904 and 1935 he helped build 68 houses on Walnut Street, 26 houses on Roosevelt Avenue, eight houses on Church Street, and 54 houses on New Street.[15] This figure of 148 is bolstered by D. M. Bare's account in his autobiography where he stated that 97 buildings were erected by the planing mill between 1910 and 1920.

The construction policies and practices of the planing mill company were not dictated directly by Bare, but through a partnership, as most of his business operations were arranged. Nonetheless, there appears to have been a cohesive similarity of architectural taste and purpose at work here whose basic aesthetic must have been set by Bare and his association of partners, managers and builders. Bare also may be credited with creating the town's first subdivision of 50 lots in 1865.

The planing mill's most active periods of development coincided with the greatest periods of expansion for the paper mill and book company. As new jobs were created, the population grew, and with it the demand for more housing. The paper mill's periods of expansion (within the period of significance), which postdated the founding of the planing mill, were 1892, 1898, 1912, 1924, and ca. 1946.

During that same general period, the town's population more than tripled from 920 to just over 3,000 between 1890 and 1940.[16]

The influence of Bare and his family over the development and affairs of one town is rather remarkable for this region. Only two comparative community models come to mind in southwestern Pennsylvania: the brick refractories towns and coal mining towns. Alexandria and Mount Union, both in neighboring Huntingdon County, were shaped in varying degrees by the refractories industry in the early 20th century. Both witnessed the construction of worker housing in the 1910s that was financed either directly by or independently of the industry. Beyond that, however, few across the board generalizations can be made regarding the industry's architectural impact on these communities, or others like them in the region. Some brick manufacturers were indeed family-owned and operated, while many others were divisions of larger corporations. Some built whole blocks of company housing, as in Mount Union, while others only dabbled in development, allowing local builders to meet the demand, as in Alexandria. Some housing resembled military barracks, as in the semi-detached houses of Mount Union, while others built single-family houses, as in South Alexandria.[17]

The other comparable regional model is the coal company town. Here everything was built following a company engineer's formula — from street layout to house plan — and most every structure reflected a hierarchy of design. Roaring Spring, by contrast, contains few, if any, of the coal company town's typical two-story semi-detached frame dwellings that fill the checkerboard streets of places like Colver (est. 1890s) in Cambria County or Windber (est. 1910s) in Somerset County.[18] And while Roaring Spring's patriarchal management may have desired orderly community development, it did not impose a blatantly class-structured environment on its work force.

One other comparative, if exceptional, community exists in the immediate region: The borough of Kistler, was built as a model workers' town in Mifflin County by a Mount Union refractories company. Located just over the Juniata River from Mount Union, Kistler was designed in 1916–17 by John Nolen, a noted town planner from Cambridge, Massachusetts. The president of the Mount Union Refractories hired Nolen to create a model town, apparently inspired by the Progressive Era notion that superior housing and other community amenities designed under a master plan would improve the moral character of its inhabitants.[19]

But in its architecture and layout, Roaring Spring resembles neither a company town nor a model workers community. Unlike coal company towns, Roaring Spring possesses a relatively wide variety of housing types without a hierarchical town plan, and unlike a model community like Kistler, no master plan appears at work like a template beneath the townscape. Instead, Roaring Spring's street pattern evolved episodically from a combination of natural topography, pre-existing land tracts, and the confluence of old country roads at the Big Spring.

Architecturally, Roaring Spring's neighborhoods display relatively little hierarchy by income or occupation. Admittedly, some areas, like the Hogback just south of the paper mill, were especially known as mill workers' enclaves, but overall the town lacks the strong homogeneity of worker house types and segmentation by occupational class common to coal company towns. D. M. Bare and his cohorts seemed to have envisioned Roaring Spring as a working community of middle-class homeowners plucked from the ranks of shopkeepers, professionals and skilled workers. The relative success of this ideal may be accounted for by the large number of skilled workers required for paper and book-making. These workers, their supervisors and the office staffs earned wages high enough to become property owners over time. Indeed, one of the achievements that D. M. Bare mentioned with pride in his autobiography was the high degree of home ownership that Roaring Spring enjoyed by 1920.

Although this egalitarian vision was carried out largely from a patriarchal vantage, its ideal is reflected in the general uniformity of lot sizes through the historic district. Each lot is just large enough to accommodate a single-family home with room for a vegetable garden and garage in the rear. Most houses are sited toward the front of their lots with modest front yards and deep backyards. Earlier houses, built along the older streets like Main and Spang, follow the traditional regional pattern of being situated close to the front lot line; later houses, built after 1900, are situated slightly back. The exceptions to this rule are the five generous house sites next to the spring on Spang Street that were set aside by Bare for his family.

Unlike heavier industrial centers in the greater region, such as Johnstown and Pittsburgh, Roaring Spring's population had remained relatively homogeneous in ethnic, racial and political terms, a historical factor that reinforced the outward social cohesiveness of the community. During the early decades of the 20th century, as the nation experienced large waves of immigration from eastern and southern Europe, the town remained primarily old-stock Protestant descendants of Germans and Scotch Irish. It also failed to experience the great northern migration of African Americans from the South looking for factory jobs after the Second World War. Roman Catholics were the last major mainstream denomination to establish a congregation in Roaring Spring. The town has also remained true to the temperance movement as championed by D. M. Bare from his earliest days. Under the Bare family influence, the town went dry in the 1890s and remains so today, as does all of the Morrisons Cove valley. It is also revealing that while the paper mill was family owned, local labor unions were practically nonexistent. The first union local — United Brotherhood of Pulp and Sulphite Workers (AFL) — was not organized until 1943.

Most of Roaring Spring's architecture belongs to a nationally common set of styles and types influenced by the rise of the railroad after 1850. The Pennsylvania Railroad's connection to the town in 1871 had a significant effect on this development by drawing the paper mill, and with it the village, into the mainstream of national commerce. The railroad opened national markets to the paper mill, allowing its business to expand beyond a narrow regional scope. By the mid-19th century, as Roaring Spring was first growing, the regional peculiarities of folk architecture were gradually disappearing under the railroad's and the industrial revolution's influences. As the town grew with the paper mill, especially after the P.R.R.'s branch line opened, the new housing styles reflected national trends rather than local vernacular traditions.

Roaring Spring can be compared in this regard with the only other paper-mill towns in the region: Tyrone and Williamsburg, both in Blair County. Tyrone, which is located on the Juniata River above Altoona, was fairly well established by 1878 when D. M. Bare co-founded a paper mill there. The new worker housing built from that year forward took on the same architectural character as Roaring Spring's after 1878. Williamsburg had originated as an 1830s canal town on another branch of the Juniata northeast of Hollidaysburg. In 1905, its community leaders persuaded former native and steel tycoon Charles Schwab to build a large paper mill. Williamsburg's post-1905 development thereafter came to resemble Roaring Spring's in style and type. The construction of comfortable single-family houses became quite common, especially Foursquares and large Gable Front types. These two examples suggest that the region's paper industry offered skilled workers' wages sufficient to support home ownership, and that local builders' housing styles in central Pennsylvania were already homogeneous by the 1870s.

One of the exceptions to this national trend is the Mennonite meeting house, originally built for the Methodist Episcopal congregation in 1867. The term "meeting house" is appropriate for this building, which bears none of the vaguely Gothic effects of most post-Civil War American churches. Rather, it is a regional throwback — an unadorned house-like structure common to early 19th century central Pennsylvania when new congregations often first met in private homes before building simple meeting houses as their first church. The Methodists were the first organized denomination (1802) in Roaring Spring, and this building was the town's first house of worship. The builder, the Rev. John A. J. Williams (1833–1909), was a Methodist minister by calling and a carpenter by trade, who moved to Roaring Spring after the Civil War. One of the borough's early leading citizens, he is credited with building many pre-1887 structures in Roaring Spring before the Roaring Spring Planing Mill's founding, including a number of houses on the south side of E. Main Street between Spang and Poplar Streets.

Master builders and carpenters like Williams, guided by patrons like D.H. Bare who also helped underwrite the Methodist church, determined the look of Roaring Spring's architecture rather than professional architects. The builders, in most cases, were not design innovators but craftsmen who adapted plans from myriad national sources such as catalogs, pattern books, magazines, mail-order services, lumberyard fliers, and trade literature. While pattern books had been available to American builders as early as the 18th century, mail-order design services became nationally common by the 1880s. Along with the influence of the railroad and mass-circulation magazines, all of these homogenizing influences contributed to the decline of regional vernacular architecture and the spread of nationally accepted styles. Significantly, many of these sources targeted conservative markets, promoting traditional designs that appealed to small-town America. As one example of this phenomenon, many of the houses in Roaring Spring built around the start of the 20th century appear to be older Victorian types, such as many Gothic Revivals models of the era which are really double-pile Georgian types in plan. Presumably, this conservative impulse was of small concern to the first owners who paid little attention to "high style" design trends. What most homeowners looked for in a house was comfort, serviceability, and an acceptable level of appeal conforming with their community's taste.

Quite often, the local distributor of trade literature and new construction trends in a small town was the neighborhood building supply center. In Roaring Spring, as in many regional towns and cities, the planing mill fulfilled that function. As a result, the importance of planing mills like Roaring Spring's in shaping the architectural character of communities in this region cannot be overstated. These operations supported builders by providing not only design plans and new ideas, but finished lumber, paint, roofing materials, and pre-fabricated components like windows, doors and molding for thousands of construction projects throughout the region. As the critical link in the local building industry, they have helped set the style for communities throughout central Pennsylvania from the beginning of the railroad era in the 1850s to the present.

In summary, Roaring Spring stands as an excellent example of a paternally founded and managed paper-mill town in central Pennsylvania, one whose buildings reflect how the growth of a hometown family-owned industry stimulated and, in many cases, directed the development patterns and architectural character of the community. Architecturally, the commercial, industrial, institutional, and residential character of Roaring Spring town retains an integrity that accurately conveys the developmental evolution of the community between 1821 and 1944. The themes of Industry, Architecture and Social History, make Roaring Spring an excellent example of a locally significant historic district.

Geography 

The town features a natural spring, which empties out into a pond, which is known to locals as the Spring Dam. The Spring Dam also contains many large fish. The water is very clear, allowing visitors to see all the way to the bottom of the pond.

Education 

Roaring Spring is home to the Spring Cove School District administration offices. The school district consists of two elementary schools (Spring Cove Elementary and Martinsburg Elementary), the Spring Cove Middle School and Central High School. The district serves Taylor, Freedom, Huston, and North Woodbury Townships as well as the towns of Roaring Spring and Martinsburg.  The district web site is http://springcove.schoolnet.com/.

Demographics 

As of the census of 2000, there were 2,418 people, 1,019 households, and 706 families residing in the borough. The population density was 3,020.5 people per square mile (1,167.0/km2). There were 1,087 housing units at an average density of 1,357.8 per square mile (524.6/km2). The racial makeup of the borough was 98.92% White, 0.17% African American, 0.04% Native American, 0.37% Asian, 0.21% Pacific Islander, 0.04% from other races, and 0.25% from two or more races. Hispanic or Latino of any race were 0.04% of the population. In the 2005 population estimate, Roaring Spring had a total population of 2,309, a 4.5% decrease from the 2000 census.

There were 1,019 households, out of which 30.3% had children under the age of 18 living with them, 54.1% were married couples living together, 11.3% had a female householder with no husband present, and 30.7% were non-families. 27.2% of all households were made up of individuals, and 14.5% had someone living alone who was 65 years of age or older. The average household size was 2.37 and the average family size was 2.88.

In the borough the population was spread out, with 22.5% under the age of 18, 9.3% from 18 to 24, 28.0% from 25 to 44, 23.3% from 45 to 64, and 16.8% who were 65 years of age or older. The median age was 38 years. For every 100 females there were 91.9 males. For every 100 females age 18 and over, there were 83.9 males.

The median income for a household in the borough was $35,329, and the median income for a family was $42,370. Males had a median income of $31,643 versus $24,352 for females. The per capita income for the borough was $17,972. About 8.0% of families and 10.2% of the population were below the poverty line, including 17.0% of those under age 18 and 9.5% of those age 65 or over.

Notable people

 Ronald Mallett, physics professor and time-travel theorist
 Erika Sifrit, convicted murderer

Notes and references

Notes 

 The population peaked at mid-century at just over 3,000; since then it has declined by nearly 20 percent [2000 U.S. Census].
 The source of Roaring Spring is believed to be an underground limestone lake deep beneath Morrisons Cove. The spring supplies a steady eight million gallons of water every 24 hours at a temperature of 50 degrees. While its flow has not diminished, the stream has been engineered into a quiet controlled cascade feeding a duck pond with fountain, the centerpiece of the town park. The spring remains the water source for the paper mill as well as a spring water bottling business established in 1980. [Golden Anniversary of Roaring Spring 1887-1937: Souvenir Program. Roaring Spring, PA: 1937, p. 21-23.]
 Daniel Mathias [D. M.] Bare (1834–1925), in various partnerships later shared with most of his sons-in-law, was the principal figure behind Roaring Spring's growth as a paper-mill town. He founded or owned the mill, the Blank Book Company, the Planing Mill, and the local bank, as well as overseeing the town's modernization around the start of the 20th century, including the introduction of electricity, and a public water supply. He also endowed many of its social organizations and institutions including the Bare Memorial Church of God.
 Blair County and Cambria County, PA: An Inventory of Historic Engineering and Industrial Sites, Washington, D.C.: National Park Service, 1990, p. 175.
 Blair and Cambria County HABS/HAER Inventory, p. 131.
 Blair and Cambria Counties HABS/HAER Inventory, p. 172-73.
 The first paper mill in the immediate region was established in 1795 just across the county line in Huntingdon at Laurel Springs near Birmingham. This operation continued for about 50 years producing a heavy rag paper for early local newspapers and other documents. Blair County and Cambria County HABS/HAER Inventory, p. 166.
 Blair and Cambria Counties HABS/HAER Inventory, p. 167.
 Adams, David M. and M. Guy Hartman. Semi-Centennial History of Roaring Spring from the Time of its First Settlement and More particularly from its Organization in 1887 to 1937. Roaring Spring, PA: News Printing Office Co., 1837, p. 105.
 In 1868, Bare was Postmaster when he sponsored the name change of the post office from Spang's Mill to Roaring Spring, despite local nominations for "Baretown."
 Excavations in 1889 for the foundation of the Church of God at East Main, Church and Spang Streets, uncovered an aboriginal burial ground. Indian mounds also once stood at the present site of Bare Memorial Park at Grove and Locust Streets.
 Combined Locks Paper Co. of Wisconsin purchased the D. M. Bare Paper Co. in 1946. Since 1971, the company has been part of Appleton Papers Inc., producing carbonless paper.
 By contrast, the mill was producing over 200 tons of paper a day by the late 1980s. [Roaring Spring Centennial History Book Committee. Centennial History Book. Roaring Spring, PA: 1987.]
 Blair and Cambria Counties HABS/HAER Inventory, p. 175. This family controlled company still operates out of its original site in addition to a more modern plant in Martinsburg, PA.
 "Morrisons Cove Herald," Thursday, August 9, 1962, p. 5.
 U. S. Census of Population data for Roaring Spring, Blair County, PA.
 Sara Amy Leach, editor. Two Historic Pennsylvania Canal Towns: Alexandria and Saltsburg. Historic American Buildings Survey/Historic American Engineering Record. Washington, D.C.: National Park Service, March 1989.
 Margaret M. Mulrooney, A Legacy of Coal: The Coal Company Towns of Southwestern Pennsylvania. Historic American Buildings Survey/Historic American Engineering Record. Washington, D.C.: National Park Service, 1989.
 Kim E. Wallace, Brickyard Towns: A History of Refractories Industry Communities in South-Central Pennsylvania. Historic American Buildings Survey/Historic American Engineering Record. Washington, D.C.: National Park Service, 1993.

General 

 Adams, David M. and M. Guy Hartman. Semi-centennial History of Roaring Spring from the Time of its First Settlement and More Particularly from its Organization in 1887 to 1937. Roaring Spring, PA: News Printing Co., 1937.
 Bare, D. M. Looking Eighty Years Backward and a History of Roaring Spring, PA. Findlay, Ohio: College Press, 1920.
 Bennett, Lola M. The Company Towns of the Rockhill Iron and Coal Company: Robertsdale and Woodvale, Pennsylvania. Washington, D.C.: Historic American Buildings Survey/Historic American Engineering Record, National Park Service, 1990.
 Bulletin of the Association for Preservation Technology. "The 'Miracle' and the 'Wizard': Preliminary Notes on Concrete Building Block Machines." Vol. V, No. 2, 1973.
 Golden Anniversary of Roaring Spring 1887-1937: Souvenir Program. Roaring Spring, PA: 1937.
 Historic American Buildings Survey/Historic American Engineering Record. Blair County and Cambria County, PA: An Inventory of Historic Engineering and Industrial Sites. Washington, D.C.: National Park Service, 1990.
 Mulrooney, Margaret M. A Legacy of Coal: The Coal Company Towns of Southwestern Pennsylvania. Historic American Buildings Survey/Historic American Engineering Record: National Park Service. Washington, D.C.: National Park Service, 1989.
 A. Pomeroy & Co. Atlas of Blair and Huntingdon Counties, Pennsylvania, 1873. Philadelphia: A. Pomeroy & Co., 1873.
 Roaring Spring 100th Anniversary 1887-1987: Souvenir Program Booklet. Roaring Spring, PA: 1987.
 Roaring Spring Centennial History Book Committee. Centennial History Book. Roaring Spring, PA: 1987.
 Seventy-Fifth Anniversary of Roaring Spring, PA. Roaring Spring: Roaring Spring Historical Committee, 1962.
 Shedd, Nancy S. Huntingdon County, PA: An Inventory of Historic Engineering and Industrial Sites. Washington, D.C.: Historic American Buildings Survey/Historic American Engineering Record: National Park Service, 1991.
 Stotz, Charles M., The Architectural Heritage of Early Western Pennsylvania: A Record of Buildings to 1860. Pittsburgh: University of Pittsburgh Press, 1966.
 Wallace, Kim E., editor. The Character of a Steel Mill City: Four Historic Neighborhoods of Johnstown, Pennsylvania. Washington, D.C.: Historic American Buildings Survey/Historic American Engineering Record, National Park Service, 1989.
 , et al. Railroad City: Four Historic Neighborhoods in Altoona, Pennsylvania. Washington, D.C.: Historic American Buildings Survey/Historic American Engineering Record, National Park Service, 1990.
 Wolf, George (ed.) Blair County's First Hundred Years, 1846–1946. Altoona, PA: Blair County, Pennsylvania Historical Society, 1945.

Citations

External links

 Roaring Spring official website
 Morrisons Cove Herald website
Morrisons Cove's Community Website – News and Information for Morrisons Cove, Pennsylvania

Populated places established in 1865
Boroughs in Blair County, Pennsylvania
1888 establishments in Pennsylvania